Carolyn Davidson may refer to:

 Carolyn Davidson (diplomat) (born 1964), British diplomat
 Carolyn Davidson (graphic designer), graphic designer who designed the Nike Swoosh logo